Aleksei Alekseyevich Shumskikh (born 1 July 1990) is a Russian professional football player. He plays for Arsenal Tula.

Club career
Shumskikh made his Russian Football National League debut for FC Torpedo Moscow on 16 April 2008 in a game against FC Metallurg-Kuzbass Novokuznetsk.

On 10 February 2020, FC Kaisar announced the signing of Shumskikh.

On 17 June 2020, Shumskikh signed for Nizhny Novgorod.

Shumskikh made his Russian Premier League debut for FC Torpedo Moscow on 17 July 2022 against PFC Sochi.

Honours
Torpedo Moscow
 Russian Football National League : 2021-22

Career statistics

References

External links
 

1990 births
Sportspeople from Barnaul
Living people
Russian footballers
Russia youth international footballers
Association football defenders
FC Torpedo Moscow players
FC Sportakademklub Moscow players
FC Saturn Ramenskoye players
FC Neftekhimik Nizhnekamsk players
FC Strogino Moscow players
FC Khimki players
FC Tom Tomsk players
FC Kaisar players
FC Nizhny Novgorod (2015) players
FC Arsenal Tula players
Russian First League players
Russian Second League players
Kazakhstan Premier League players
Russian Premier League players
Russian expatriate footballers
Expatriate footballers in Kazakhstan
Russian expatriate sportspeople in Kazakhstan